The Morgan County, West Virginia race riot of 1919 was caused by big business using African-American strikebreakers against striking white workers in Morgan County, West Virginia.

Racial incident
On the same day of the riots one Hugh Ferguson, a Martinsburg African-American, was accused of criminally assaulting Mrs. Ernest Zimmerman at her home near Brosius, Morgan
County (now known as Hancock, West Virginia). An angry mob of several hundred men formed around the jail hoping to lynch Ferguson. Sheriff C. R. Hovermale was forced to flee with Ferguson to Berkeley Springs. When the lynching mob followed them they were again forced to flee to the county seat of Berkeley County, West Virginia, Martinsburg.

Aftermath

This uprising was one of several incidents of civil unrest that began in the so-called American Red Summer, of 1919. Terrorist attacks on black communities and white oppression in over three dozen cities and counties. In most cases, white mobs attacked African American neighborhoods. In some cases, black community groups resisted the attacks, especially in Chicago and Washington DC. Most deaths occurred in rural areas during events like the Elaine Race Riot in Arkansas, where an estimated 100 to 240 black people and 5 white people were killed. Also in 1919 were the Chicago Race Riot and Washington D.C. race riot which killed 38 and 39 people respectively, and with both having many more non-fatal injuries and extensive property damage reaching up into the millions of dollars.

See also
Washington race riot of 1919
Mass racial violence in the United States
List of incidents of civil unrest in the United States

Bibliography 
Notes

References 
 - Total pages: 328 
   
 

Red Summer
African-American history between emancipation and the civil rights movement
White American riots in the United States
1919 riots in the United States
Racially motivated violence against African Americans
History of racism in West Virginia
July 1919 events
African-American history of West Virginia
Riots and civil disorder in West Virginia